Charles Benton Kuhns  (October 27, 1876 – July 15, 1922) was a third baseman and shortstop in Major League Baseball. He played in one game for the Pittsburgh Pirates on June 4, 1897 and in seven games for the Boston Beaneaters in 1899. His minor league career stretched from 1897 through 1905.

External links

1876 births
1922 deaths
Pittsburgh Pirates players
Boston Beaneaters players
Baseball players from Pennsylvania
Major League Baseball third basemen
Major League Baseball shortstops
19th-century baseball players
Fall River Indians players
Bradford Pirates players
Worcester Farmers players
Syracuse Stars (minor league baseball) players
Hartford Indians players
Wooden Nutmegs players
Indianapolis Indians players
Toronto Maple Leafs (International League) players
Montreal Royals players
People from Freeport, Pennsylvania